The 2017 188BET Champion of Champions was a professional non-ranking snooker tournament that took place between 6 and 12 November 2017 at the Ricoh Arena in Coventry, England.

John Higgins was the defending champion, but was  0–6 by Ronnie O'Sullivan in the second round.

Ronnie O'Sullivan made his 900th century in the semi-final against Anthony Hamilton.

Shaun Murphy won the tournament, defeating Ronnie O'Sullivan 10–8 in the final.

Prize fund
The breakdown of prize money for 2017 is shown below:
 Winner: £100,000
 Runner-up: £50,000
 Losing semi-finalist: £25,000
 Group runner-up: £17,500
 First round losers: £12,500
 Total: £370,000

Players
Qualification for the 2017 188BET Champion of Champions tournament is determined by the winners of 24 tournaments over a one-year period, from the 2016 Champion of Champions to the 2017 International Championship, thereby including tournaments from both the 2016/2017 and 2017/2018 snooker seasons. The tournaments have been split into groups to determine the order of qualification, with the winners of the first sixteen listed tournaments guaranteed a place.

The following players qualified for the tournament:

 Notes
 On 24 October 2017, Stuart Bingham, who had qualified as a winner of the 2017 Welsh Open, was banned for six months for betting breaches.
 Mark Williams, the winner of the 2017 Six-red World Championship, was the tournament reserve player.

Main draw

Final

Century breaks
Total: 20

 138, 134, 124, 109, 108, 101  Ronnie O'Sullivan
 133  Anthony Hamilton
 131, 123, 121, 101  Shaun Murphy
 125, 112  Mark Selby
 110, 103  Ryan Day
 108  Barry Hawkins
 105, 103  Luca Brecel
 102  Michael White
 100  Marco Fu

References

External links
 

2016
2017 in snooker
2017 in English sport
Sports competitions in Coventry
2010s in Coventry
Champion of Champions